Midnight Blue is an album by composer/bassist Graham Collier recorded in 1975 and originally released on his own Mosaic label.

Reception

Allmusic said "these pieces on Midnight Blue all feel very ponderous, open, and yet unyielding. This is uncharacteristic of most of Collier's work, and it feels as if even he didn't know what he was going for when he wrote these works. The lilting swing that is at the heart of his best work is absent here, and this feels more like an ECM recording than anything else". On All About Jazz Nic Jones noted "It might be argued that the six-piece band featured on both Darius and Midnight Blue is one of the best Collier has ever headed".

Track listing
All compositions by Graham Collier.

 "Midnight Blue" – 22:48
 "Adam" – 7:02
 "Cathedra" – 17:15

Personnel
Graham Collier – composer, director, bass
Harry Beckett – trumpet, flugelhorn
Derek Wadsworth – trombone
Ed Speight – guitar
Roger Dean – piano
John Webb – drums

References

1975 albums
Graham Collier albums